Rubus irasuensis is a Mesoamerican species of brambles in the rose family. It grows in southern Mexico (Chiapas) and in Central America (Guatemala, Honduras, Nicaragua, Costa Rica).

Rubus irasuensis is a perennial with stems up to 150 cm tall, with bristles and curved prickles. Leaves are compound with 3 or 5 leaflets. Flowers are pink. Fruits are cylindrical.

References

irasuensis
Flora of Chiapas
Flora of Central America
Plants described in 1853